The National Counter Terrorism Academy (NCTA) is a training center for U.S. state and local law enforcement officers. The Academy operates at the LAPD's Ahmanson Training Center, near the Los Angeles International Airport.

Creation
LAPD chief William Bratton founded the Academy in 2008, in partnership with the Center for Policing Terrorism.  The academy began operation with a bricks-and-mortar location; a virtual, or online, academy; a digital library; and mobile academic teams.

Curriculum
The Academy's five-month course aims to teach trainees how to recognize terrorist cells and build regional intelligence networks.  Topics of instruction include homegrown radicalization; methods for interdicting terrorism finance; case studies of significant terrorism plots; the historical roots of terrorism; religious extremism, homegrown terror groups; the evolution of al-Qaida; and culturally sensitive interviewing techniques.

Philosophy
The Academy advances a theory of intelligence-led policing.  The doctrine fuses Israeli counter-terrorist tactics with the Fixing Broken Windows theories advanced by criminologist George L. Kelling and social scientist James Q. Wilson.

References

Law enforcement in the United States
Non-military counterterrorist organizations